William Lawrence Boyd (June 5, 1895 – September 12, 1972) was an American film actor who is known for portraying the cowboy hero Hopalong Cassidy.

Biography

Boyd was born in Hendrysburg, Ohio, and reared in Cambridge, Ohio and Tulsa, Oklahoma, living in Tulsa from 1909 to 1913. He was the son of a day laborer, Charles William Boyd, and his wife, the former Lida Wilkens (aka Lyda). Following his father's death, he moved to California and worked as an orange picker, surveyor, tool dresser and auto salesman.

In Hollywood, he found work as an extra in Why Change Your Wife? and other films. During World War I, he enlisted in the army but was exempt from military service because of a "weak heart". More prominent film roles followed, including his breakout role as Jack Moreland in Cecil B. DeMille's The Road to Yesterday (1925) which starred also Joseph Schildkraut, Jetta Goudal, and Vera Reynolds. Boyd's performance in the film was praised by critics, while movie-goers were equally impressed by his easy charm, charisma, and intense good-looks. Due to Boyd's growing popularity, DeMille soon cast him as the leading man in the highly acclaimed silent drama film, The Volga Boatman. Boyd's role as Feodor impressed critics, and with Boyd now firmly established as a matinee idol and romantic leading man, he began earning an annual salary of $100,000. He acted in DeMille's extravaganza The King of Kings (in which he played Simon of Cyrene, helping Jesus carry the cross) and DeMille's Skyscraper (1928). He then appeared in D.W. Griffith's Lady of the Pavements (1929).

Radio Pictures ended Boyd's contract in 1931 when his picture was mistakenly run in a newspaper story about the arrest of another actor, William "Stage" Boyd, on gambling and liquor charges. Although the newspaper apologized, explaining the mistake in the following day's newspaper, Boyd said, "The damage was already done." William "Stage" Boyd died in 1935, the same year William L. Boyd became Hopalong Cassidy, the role that led to his enduring fame. But at the time in 1931, Boyd was virtually broke and without a job, and for a few years he was credited in films as "Bill Boyd" to prevent being mistaken for the other William Boyd.

Hopalong Cassidy
In 1935, Boyd was offered the supporting role of Red Connors in the movie Hop-Along Cassidy, but he asked to be considered for the title role and won it. The original character of Hopalong Cassidy, written by Clarence E. Mulford for pulp magazines, was changed from a hard-drinking, rough-living red-headed wrangler to a cowboy hero who did not smoke, swear, or drink alcohol (his drink of choice being sarsaparilla) and who always let the bad guy start the fight. Although Boyd "never branded a cow or mended a fence, cannot bulldog a steer" and disliked Western music, he became indelibly associated with the Hopalong character and, like the cowboy stars Roy Rogers and Gene Autry, gained lasting fame in the Western film genre.

Boyd estimated in 1940 that he had starred in 28 outdoor films in which he fired 30,000 shots and killed at least 100 "varmints". He wore out 12 costumes and 60 ten-gallon hats, rode his horse Topper more than 2000 miles and rode herd on 5000 head of cattle. A score or more of heroines had been saved, but were never kissed.

The films were more polished and impressive than the usual low-budget "program westerns". The Hopalong Cassidy adventures usually boasted superior outdoor photography of scenic locations and name supporting players familiar from major Hollywood films. Big-city theaters, which usually wouldn't play Westerns, noticed the high quality of the productions and gave the series more exposure than other cowboy films could hope for. Paramount Pictures released the films through 1941. United Artists produced them from 1943.

The producer Harry "Pop" Sherman wanted to make more ambitious epics and abandoned the Hopalong Cassidy franchise. Boyd, determined to keep it alive, produced the last 12 Cassidy features himself on noticeably lower budgets. By this time, interest in the character had waned, and with far fewer theaters still showing the films, the series ended in 1948.

Boyd insisted on buying the rights to all of the Hopalong Cassidy films. Harry Sherman no longer cared about the property—he thought both the films and the star were played out—and regarded Boyd's all-consuming interest with skepticism. Boyd was so single-minded about his mission that he sold or mortgaged almost everything he owned to meet Sherman's price of $350,000 for the rights and the film backlog.

Hoppy rides again

In 1948 Boyd, now regarded as a washed-up cowboy star and with his fortunes at their lowest ebb, brought a print of one of his older pictures to the local NBC television station and offered it at a nominal rental, hoping for new exposure. The film was received so well that NBC asked for more, and within months Boyd released the entire library to the national network. They became extremely popular and began the long-running genre of Westerns on television. Boyd's desperate gamble paid off, making him the first national TV star and restoring his personal fortune. Like Rogers and Autry, Boyd licensed much merchandise, including such products as Hopalong Cassidy watches, trash cans, cups, dishes, Topps trading cards, a comic strip, comic books, cowboy outfits, home-movie digests of his Paramount releases via Castle Films, and a new Hopalong Cassidy radio show, which ran from 1948 to 1952.

The actor identified with his character, often dressing as a cowboy in public. Although Boyd's portrayal of Hopalong made him very wealthy, he believed that it was his duty to help strengthen his "friends"—America's youth. The actor refused to license his name for products he viewed as unsuitable or dangerous and turned down personal appearances at which his "friends" would be charged admission. Boyd also lent his likeness to "diplomas" issued by a children's  horse-riding 'academy' at the Camelback Inn in Scottsdale, AZ. He made at least one personal appearance at the dude ranch dressed as Hopalong, in December 1959.

Boyd appeared as Hopalong Cassidy on the cover of numerous national magazines, including Look (August 29, 1950)  and Time (November 27, 1950). For Thanksgiving in 1950, he led the Carolinas' Carrousel Parade in Charlotte, North Carolina, and drew an estimated crowd of 500,000 persons, the largest in the parade's history.

Boyd had a cameo role as himself in Cecil B. DeMille's 1952 circus epic, The Greatest Show on Earth. DeMille reportedly asked Boyd to take the role of Moses in his remake of The Ten Commandments, but Boyd felt his identification with the Cassidy character would make it impossible for audiences to accept him as Moses.

Personal life

Boyd was married five times, first to wealthy Massachusetts heiress Laura Maynes, then to the actresses Ruth Miller, Elinor Fair, Dorothy Sebastian and Grace Bradley. His only son, William Wallace Boyd, whose mother was Boyd's second wife, Ruth Miller, died of pertussis at age 9 months. After his retirement from the screen, Boyd invested both time and money in real estate and moved to Palm Desert, California. He refused interviews and photographs in later years, preferring not to disillusion his millions of fans who remembered him as a screen idol. 

Boyd was a lifelong Republican and supported the campaign of Dwight Eisenhower during the 1952 presidential election.

For his contributions to the film industry, Boyd has a motion pictures star on the Hollywood Walk of Fame at 1734 Vine Street. In 1995, he was inducted into the Western Performers Hall of Fame at the National Cowboy & Western Heritage Museum in Oklahoma City, Oklahoma. 

In 1972, Boyd died from complications related to Parkinson's disease and congestive heart failure. He was survived by his fifth wife, the actress Grace Bradley Boyd, who died on September 21, 2010 on her 97th birthday. He is buried in the Sanctuary of Guiding Love alcove in the Great Mausoleum at Forest Lawn Memorial Park (Glendale).

Selected filmography

 Old Wives for New (1918) – Minor Role (uncredited)
 Was He Guilty? (1919) – (uncredited)
 The Six Best Cellars (1920) – Holsappel (uncredited)
 Why Change Your Wife? (1920) – Naval Officer at Hotel (uncredited)
 The City of Masks (1920) – Carpenter
 Something to Think About (1920) – (uncredited)
 A City Sparrow (1920) – Hughie Ray
 The Life of the Party (1920) – One of Leary's Office Staff (uncredited)
 The Jucklins (1921) – Dan Stuart
 Paying the Piper (1921) – (uncredited)
 Forbidden Fruit (1921) – Billiards Player (uncredited)
 Brewster's Millions (1921) – Harrison
 A Wise Fool (1921) – Gerard Fynes
 Moonlight and Honeysuckle (1921) – Robert V. Courtney
 The Affairs of Anatol (1921) – Guest (uncredited)
 After the Show (1921) – (uncredited)
 Exit the Vamp (1921) – Robert Pitts
 Fool's Paradise (1921) – (uncredited)
 Saturday Night (1922) – Party Guest (uncredited)
 Moran of the Lady Letty (1922) – Ramon's Friend at Homecoming (uncredited)
 Bobbed Hair (1922) – Dick Barton
 Nice People (1922) – Oliver Comstock
 On the High Seas (1922) – Dick Deveraux
 Manslaughter (1922) – (uncredited)
 The Young Rajah (1922) – Stephen Van Kovert
 Michael O'Halloran (1923) – Douglas Bruce
 Hollywood (1923) – Himself
 Adam's Rib (1923) – Party Guest (uncredited)
 The Temple of Venus (1923) – Stanley Dale
 Enemies of Children (1923)
 Triumph (1924) – Minor Role (uncredited)
 Changing Husbands (1924) – Conrad Bradshaw
 Tarnish (1924) – Bill
 Feet of Clay (1924) – Young Society Man (uncredited)
 Forty Winks (1925) – Lt. Gerald Hugh Butterworth
 The Midshipman (1925) – Spud
 The Road to Yesterday (1925) – Jack Moreland
 Steel Preferred (1925) – Wally Gay
 The Volga Boatman (1926) – Feodor
 Eve's Leaves (1926) – Bill Stanley
 The Last Frontier (1926) – Tom Kirby
 Her Man o' War (1926) – Jim Sanderson
 Jim, the Conqueror (1926) – Jim Burgess
 Wolves of the Air (1927) – Jerry Tanner
 The Yankee Clipper (1927) – Captain Hal Winslow
 The King of Kings (1927) – Simon of Cyrene
 Two Arabian Knights (1927) – W. Daingerfield Phelps III
 Dress Parade (1927) – Vic Donovan
 The Night Flyer (1928) – Jim Bradley
 Skyscraper (1928) – Blondy
 The Cop (1928) – Pete Smith
 Power (1928) – Husky
 Lady of the Pavements (1929) – Count Karl Von Arnim
 The Leatherneck (1929) – William Calhoun
 The Flying Fool (1929) – Bill Taylor
 High Voltage (1929) – Bill
 His First Command (1929) – Terry Culver
 Officer O'Brien (1930) – Bill O'Brien
 The Painted Desert (1931) – Bill Holbrook
 Beyond Victory (1931) – Sergeant Bill Thatcher
 The Big Gamble (1931) – Alan Beckwith
 Suicide Fleet (1932) – Baltimore Clark
 Carnival Boat (1932) – Buck Gannon
 Men of America (1932) – Jim Parker
 Flaming Gold (1933) – Dan Manton
 Lucky Devils (1933) – Skipper Clark
 Emergency Call (1933) – Joe Bradley
 Cheaters (1934) – Steve Morris
 Port of Lost Dreams (1934) – Lars Christensen
 Hop–Along Cassidy (1935) – Bill Hopalong Cassidy
 The Eagle's Brood (1935) – Bill Hopalong Cassidy
 Racing Luck (1935) – Dan Morgan
 Bar 20 Rides Again (1935) – Hopalong Cassidy
 Heart of the West (1936) – Hopalong Cassidy
 Call of the Prairie (1936) – Hopalong Cassidy
 Three on the Trail (1936) – Hopalong Cassidy
 Federal Agent (1936) – Bob Woods
 Burning Gold (1936) – Jim Thornton
 Go–Get–'Em–Haines (1936) – Steve Haines
 Hopalong Cassidy Returns (1936) – Hopalong Cassidy
 Trail Dust (1936) – Hopalong Cassidy
 Borderland (1937) – Hopalong Cassidy
 Hills of Old Wyoming (1937) – Hopalong Cassidy
 North of the Rio Grande (1937) – Hopalong Cassidy
 Rustlers' Valley (1937) – Hopalong Cassidy
 Hopalong Rides Again (1937) – Hopalong Cassidy
 Texas Trail (1937) – Hopalong Cassidy
 Partners of the Plains (1938) – Hopalong Cassidy
 Cassidy of Bar 20 (1938) – Hopalong Cassidy
 Heart of Arizona (1938) – Hopalong Cassidy
 Bar 20 Justice (1938) – Hopalong Cassidy
 Pride of the West (1938) – Hopalong Cassidy
 Sunset Trail (1938) – Hopalong Cassidy
 In Old Mexico (1938) – Hopalong Cassidy
 The Frontiersmen (1938) – Hopalong Cassidy
 Silver on the Sage (1939) – Hopalong Cassidy
 Renegade Trail (1939) – Hopalong Cassidy
 Range War (1939) – Hopalong Cassidy
 Law of the Pampas (1939) – Hopalong Cassidy
 Santa Fe Marshal (1940) – Hopalong Cassidy
 The Showdown (1940) – Hopalong Cassidy
 Hidden Gold (1940) – Hopalong Cassidy
 Stagecoach War (1940) – Hopalong Cassidy
 Three Men from Texas (1940) – Hopalong Cassidy
 Doomed Caravan (1941) – Hopalong Cassidy
 In Old Colorado (1941) – Hopalong Cassidy
 Border Vigilantes (1941) – Hopalong Cassidy
 Pirates on Horseback (1941) – Hopalong Cassidy
 Wide Open Town (1941) – Hopalong Cassidy
 Stick to Your Guns (1941) – Hopalong Cassidy
 Riders of the Timberline (1941) – Hopalong Cassidy
 Twilight on the Trail (1941) – Hopalong Cassidy
 Outlaws of the Desert (1941) – Hopalong Cassidy
 Secrets of the Wasteland (1941) – Hopalong Cassidy
 Undercover Man (1942) – Hopalong Cassidy
 Lost Canyon (1942) – Hopalong Cassidy
 Hoppy Serves a Writ (1943) – Hopalong Cassidy
 Border Patrol (1943) – Hopalong Cassidy
 Leather Burners (1943) – Hopalong Cassidy
 Colt Comrades (1943) – Hopalong Cassidy
 Bar 20 (1943) – Hopalong Cassidy
 False Colors (1943) – Hopalong Cassidy
 Riders of the Deadline (1943) – Hopalong Cassidy
 Lumberjack (1944) – Hopalong Cassidy
 Mystery Man (1944) – Hopalong Cassidy
 Texas Masquerade (1944) - Hopalong Cassidy
 Forty Thieves (1944) – Hopalong Cassidy
 The Devil's Playground (1946) – Hopalong Cassidy
 Fool's Gold (1946) – Hopalong Cassidy
 Unexpected Guest (1947) – Hopalong Cassidy
 Dangerous Venture (1947) – Hopalong Cassidy
 The Marauders (1947) – Hopalong Cassidy
 Hoppy's Holiday (1947) – Hopalong Cassidy
 Silent Conflict (1948) – Hopalong Cassidy
 The Dead Don't Dream (1948) – Hopalong Cassidy
 Sinister Journey (1948) – Hopalong Cassidy
 Borrowed Trouble (1948) – Hopalong Cassidy
 False Paradise (1948) – Hopalong Cassidy
 Strange Gamble (1948) – Hopalong Cassidy
 The Greatest Show on Earth (1952) – Hopalong Cassidy (uncredited)
 Little Smokey: The True Story of America's Forest Fire Preventin' Bear (1953, Short) – Hopalong Cassidy (narrator)
 Hopalong Cassidy (1949–1954, TV Series) – Hopalong Cassidy

References

Further reading
 Boyd, Grace Bradley; Cochran, Michael (2008) Hopalong Cassidy: An American Legend. York, Pennsylvania: Gemstone. .

External links

William Boyd as Hopalong Cassidy
Hopalong Cassidy Music
Photos of William Boyd
Encyclopedia of Oklahoma History and Culture entry

William Boyd Papers 1911–1995 at the University of Wyoming – American Heritage Center
Hopalong Cassidy: Cowboy Hero and Franchise Empire at the AHC blog
Hoppy's Saddle is not Hoppy's Saddle – The Mystery Solved at the AHC blog

1895 births
1972 deaths
Neurological disease deaths in California
Male actors from Ohio
American male film actors
American male radio actors
American male silent film actors
Burials at Forest Lawn Memorial Park (Glendale)
Deaths from Parkinson's disease
People from Guernsey County, Ohio
People from Palm Desert, California
Male actors from Tulsa, Oklahoma
Male Western (genre) film actors
Western (genre) television actors
20th-century American male actors
Ohio Republicans
California Republicans
Oklahoma Republicans